Juan Díaz Covarrubias (27 December 1837 – 11 April 1859) was a Mexican writer and poet of liberal ideology. He was one of the Martyrs of Tacubaya who were executed during the War of the Reform in Mexico.

Biography 
Diaz Covarrubias was born in Xalapa, Veracruz on 27 December 1837. His father, poet José de Jesús Díaz, had an artistic influence on him, since it was customary to hold tertulia at the home. He became friends with law student Manuel Mateos —brother of — and Ignacio Manuel Altamirano. He also was a pupil of Ignacio Ramírez.

Despite his great interest in literature and poetry, in 1852 Diaz Covarrubias began to study for a career in medicine. He joined the Liberal Party and simultaneously published articles and poems in the newspapers El Monitor Republicano, El Siglo Diez y Nueve and the Diario de Avisos.

Hearing rumours of the imminent clash between liberal and conservative troops in Tacubaya, he went there to offer his medical services to the troops of Santos Degollado. The battle of Tacubaya resulted to be a victory for the conservative army commanded by Leonardo Márquez. After the battle General Miguel Miramón ordered the Liberal officials who had been apprehended to be executed. In an excess committed by the soldiers of Márquez, in addition to officials and soldiers, doctors and civilians were executed. Covarrubias and his friend Mateos died at the paredón (execution wall) in Tacubaya, Mexico City on 11 April 1859. Manuel Acuña called Diaz Covarrubias "the Poet Martyr".

The town of San Juan Sugar in Hueyapan de Ocampo, Veracruz was named in his honour on 20 May 1938. Also Chalco de Díaz Covarrubias, municipal seat of the surrounding municipality of Chalco, added the surname of the poet to its name, as a tribute to his work.

Works 
He belonged to the romanticism movement. and is considered one of the pioneers of the Mexican historical novel. In his short life, he wrote numerous poems, several tales and three novels:
 Gil Gómez el insurgente (Gil Gómez the Insurgent)
 La clase media (The Half Class)
 El diablo en México (The Devil in Mexico)
 La azucena y la violeta (The Lily and the Violet)
 La sensitiva (The Sensitive Girl)
 Episodio juvenil (Juvenile Episode)
In 1959, on the centenary of his death, the historian Clementina Díaz y de Ovando compiled his Complete Works.

References 

1859 deaths
1837 births
Executed Mexican people
Mexican male novelists
Mexican male poets
Mexican male writers
19th-century Mexican poets
19th-century Mexican novelists
19th-century male writers